Charles Fry could refer to: 

C. B. Fry (Charles Burgess Fry, 1872–1956), English cricketer and journalist
Charles Fry (born 1940), English cricketer and grandson of C. B. Fry
Charlie Fry, Australian rules footballer

See also
Charles Fried (born 1935), American jurist and lawyer
Charles Fries (disambiguation)
Charles Frye (disambiguation)